Mira Jalosuo (born 3 February 1989) is a Finnish ice hockey player, currently serving as an assistant coach for the Minnesota section of the Professional Women's Hockey Players Association (PWHPA) and as head coach of the girls' ice hockey team at Stillwater Area High School in Oak Park Heights, Minnesota. As a member of the Finnish national team, she won a bronze medal at the 2018 Winter Olympic Games and bronze medals at the IIHF World Women's Championships in 2008, 2009, 2011, 2015, and 2017.

She attended the University of Minnesota and played NCAA Division I ice hockey with the Minnesota Golden Gophers from 2009 until her graduation in 2013. She was one of the first European players to join the team and recorded 19 goals and 37 assists (56 points) during her collegiate career. In her post-collegiate and professional playing career, she played with SKIF Nizhny Novgorod of the Russian Women's Hockey League, Luleå HF/MSSK of the Swedish Riksserien, Oulun Kärpät Naiset of the Finnish Naisten Liiga (and its predecessor the Naisten SM-sarja), and the Minnesota Whitecaps.

Playing career
Jalosuo was born in 1989 to Aki-Pekka and Sirpa Jalosuo, and raised in Lieksa, a small town in the North Karelia region of eastern Finland. When she was in fifth grade she began playing organized hockey with the local club, Lieksan Hurtat, where, at the encouragement of her coaches and teammates, she played on both the girl's and boy's teams.

Motivated to further improve her game, she moved to Oulu at age 15 and joined the Oulun Kärpät Naiset of the Naisten SM-sarja. While playing in the premier women's league in Finland she also attended Kastelli School, one of Finland's best public centers for primary and secondary education. With Kärpät she won Finnish Championship silver medals in 2006 and 2007 and bronze medals in 2005 and 2008 and was named to the SM-sarja All-Star Team in 2007 and 2008. Jalosuo served as team captain for the 2008–09 season, an impressive accomplishment when one considers that she was only 18 years old and still in high school.

During her time living in Oulu, Jalosuo also played with the Finnish national team, playing in four world championships, including every championship game in 2008 and 2009.

When asked to reflect on this period, Jalosuo has said, “I would say that I was a very good locker room player who treated everyone fairly. On the ice I had a pretty good shot, and I was able to read the game well.”

Jalosuo was recruited by multiple American universities with NCAA Division I women's ice hockey teams as her graduation from Kastelli School (2009) approached. She toured The Ohio State University, the University of Minnesota Duluth, and the University of Minnesota in 2008. She ultimately selected to attend the University of Minnesota and don the Minnesota Golden Gophers’ sweater as an incoming freshman for the 2009-10 scholastic year.

University of Minnesota
Jalosuo and her college roommate, goaltender Noora Räty, became the first European players to join the Minnesota Golden Gophers. During her four years on the team, Jalosuo scored a total of 57 points, with 19 goals and 37 assists over 152 games. She played in 37 games during her 2009–10 freshman season, recording one goal and five assists, with a +4 rating. She scored her first collegiate point when she assisted on Chelsey Jones' goal against Syracuse Orange on 4 October 2009. She missed three games in January to play with the Finnish National Team at the Meco Cup in Germany. Jalouso scored her first collegiate goal in an 8–5 win over the MSU-Mankato Mavericks during the first round of the Western Collegiate Hockey Association playoffs on 26 February. She was the last player cut for the 2010 Winter Olympics, which she called "a turning point in my life and hockey career" that made her more determined to make a future Olympic team.

During her 2010–11 sophomore season, Jalosuo was a WCHA All-Academic Team honoree and letterwinner. She played all 38 games of the season and recorded four goals (all on the power play and eight assists, with a +9 rating. Paired with Anne Schleper, Jalosuo had two multi-point games, scored her first assist of the season against the St. Cloud State Huskies on 22 October, and scored game-winning goals in both games against the Harvard Crimson on 26 and 28 November. She also set up Terry Kelly's goal in the 4–2 victory over the Minnesota–Duluth Bulldogs in a WCHA semi-final game on 4 March. During her 2011–12 junior season, Jalosuo was an Academic All-WCHA and scored a total of three goals and six assists, netting her first goal of the season in a 4–0 win over Syracuse on 1 October. She scored one assist each during the WCHA first round and semi-finals, and had a +3 rating during a 5–1 National Collegiate Athletic Association Quarterfinal win over the University of North Dakota on 10 March.

In her 2011–12 senior season, Jalosuo recorded a career-high 30 points, with 11 goals and 19 assists over all 41 games of the season, for a +38 rating. Four of her goals were game-winners, and she was named to the All-WCHA Third Team and the All-WCHA Academic Team. She scored a goal in each of game of the opening series against the Colgate Raiders on 28 and 29 September, and had two-point streaks during the season, recording six assists and one goal between 12 and 20 October, and five assists and one goal between 2 and 16 February. She scored a goal in the 5–0 shutout over the Bemidji State Beavers in the WCHA First Round on 1 March, as well as a goal in a win, also 5–0, against the Ohio State Buckeyes on 8 March in the semi-finals of the WCHA Final Face-Off. Jalosuo assisted Terry Kelly on the game-winning goal in their triple-overtime victory over North Dakota on 16 March in the NCAA QUarterfinals, and recorded the first goal of the National Championship game against the Boston University Terriers on 24 March.

Elite club play
Jalouso played with SKIF Nizhny Novgorod of the Russian Women's Hockey League for the 2013–14 and 2014–15 seasons. She won the Russian Championship with the team in 2014. Her teammates from the Finnish national team, Karoliina Rantamäki and goaltenders Noora Räty and Meeri Räisänen, also played with SKIF for one or both of the seasons that Jalouso was with the team.

In the 2015–16 season Jalouso played with Luleå HF in the Swedish Women's Hockey League (SDHL). She played only three regular season games with the team but managed to record two goals and five assists for seven points in that short span. With Luleå she played in seven playoff games and she contributed five points (3+2) to the team's Swedish Championship victory in 2016. Michelle Karvinen and Nora Tallus, teammates from the Finnish national team, also played with Luleå in that season.

Jalouso returned to the Twin Cities, her college stomping grounds, to play with the Minnesota Whitecaps for the 2016–17 and 2017–18 seasons. The Whitecaps were independent in those seasons and played the majority of their games against women's college squads.

The Whitecaps’ non-standard schedule allowed Jalouso to play some regular season games with Oulun Kärpät, the team she had played with in Finland prior to her collegiate career, in the 2016–17 and 2017–18 seasons. She also played with Kärpät in the 2017 Finnish Championship and contributed ten points (5+5) in eight games, leading to the team's Aurora Borealis Cup victory. Her efforts earned her the Karoliina Rantamäki Award as the most valuable player of the Naisten SM-Liiga playoffs.

References

External links
 
 
 

1989 births
Living people
Finnish expatriate ice hockey coaches in the United States
Finnish expatriate ice hockey players in Russia
Finnish expatriate ice hockey players in Sweden
Finnish expatriate ice hockey players in the United States
Finnish women's ice hockey defencemen
Luleå HF/MSSK players
Ice hockey players at the 2014 Winter Olympics
Ice hockey players at the 2018 Winter Olympics
Medalists at the 2018 Winter Olympics
Minnesota Golden Gophers women's ice hockey players
Minnesota Whitecaps players
Naisten Liiga All-Stars
Olympic bronze medalists for Finland
Olympic ice hockey players of Finland
Olympic medalists in ice hockey
Oulun Kärpät Naiset players
People from Lieksa
Sportspeople from North Karelia